The Faculty of Applied Science and Engineering is an academic division of the University of Toronto devoted to study and research in engineering. Founded in 1873 as the School of Practical Science, it is still known today by the longtime nickname of Skule. The faculty is based primarily across 16 buildings on the southern side of the university campus in Downtown Toronto, in addition to operating the Institute for Aerospace Studies facility. The faculty administers undergraduate, master's and doctoral degree programs, as well as a dual-degree program with the Rotman School of Management.

History

The School of Practical Science (S.P.S.) was created in 1873 by an act of the Legislative Assembly of Ontario. The school was to serve the needs of a growing economy at a time marked by rapidly evolving sciences and technologies. In 1878, the school enrolled its first class for a three-year curriculum in the subjects of mining, engineering, mechanics and manufacturing.

The school was established as an affiliate of the University of Toronto, but operated as a separate institution. The first classes were held in a red-brick building that was known as the "Little Red Skulehouse" by attending students. The school was renamed as the Faculty of Applied Science and Engineering on June 20, 1906, when it officially became part of the university. In 1949, the University of Toronto Institute for Aerospace Studies opened for graduate studies and research in aeronautical and space sciences. In 1962, the Institute of Biomedical Electronics (now Institute of Biomedical Engineering) was established for graduate studies. The original Skulehouse was finally demolished in 1966, by which time the faculty had already expanded to occupy a dozen other buildings that formed an engineering precinct in the southern part of campus.

The Bahen Centre for Information Technology was completed in 2002 to meet the growing needs of the university’s computer science and electrical and computer engineering programs. Designed by Diamond + Schmitt Architects, the $111 million facility contains 20,000 gross square metres and is named for John Bahen, the president of Peter Kiewit and Sons. The centre was described by Canadian Architect magazine as "a complex interweaving of urbanity, public space and sustainability", and it won the Ontario Association of Architects Award, the City of Toronto Architecture and Urban Design Award, and bronze in the environmental category of the National Post Design Exchange Award.

Academics

There are 5,090 undergraduate students and 1,842 graduate students enrolled in the faculty, with 43,000 living Skule alumni worldwide. The undergraduate programs are conducted by the departments of chemical, civil, computer, electrical, industrial, materials, mechanical, and mineral engineering. The faculty awards Bachelor of Applied Science (BASc) degrees for all undergraduate engineering programs, with the exception of the Engineering Science program, in which a Bachelor of Applied Science in Engineering Science is awarded. The faculty also offers graduate degrees. The Master of Engineering (MEng) degree consists of 1 year of full-time study, primarily requiring the completion of coursework and/or a major project. The Master of Applied Science (MASc) degree consists of 2 years of full-time study, and requires the completion of course work and a major thesis. Unlike the MASc, which leads to a PhD degree, the MEng is a terminal degree.

Courses in several majors overlap: the electrical engineering curriculum shares courses with the computer engineering curriculum in the first two years, while chemical engineering shares a set of courses with the environmental engineering option of the civil engineering department. The undergraduate engineering science program consists of courses from a broad range of departments and places greater emphasis on theory than in a traditional engineering curriculum. In the final two years of the program, each student specializes in one of several concentration options, including biomedical engineering, aerospace engineering, and machine learning.

The faculty requires undergraduate students to accumulate 600 hours of engineering work experience, commonly obtained through employment in between academic terms. Students may also choose to participate in a paid internship program called the Professional Experience Year, which involves employment at an engineering company for a period of 12 to 16 months. The Jeffrey Skoll program allows engineering students to earn a bachelor's degree in engineering from the faculty followed by a Master of Business Administration degree from the Rotman School of Management.

Admissions standards are specific to each department, and the faculty had an entry average of 93.7%. In 2010-2011, Engineering Science had an entry average of 93%, and averages have been increasing yearly since then.

Research

Collaborations with industry 
On April 7, 2022, the University of Toronto announced a partnership with American biotechnology company Moderna intended to develop new tools to prevent and treat infectious diseases, collaborating with researchers in the fields of molecular genetics, biomedical engineering, and biochemistry. The collaboration is a joint venture across U of T's Faculties of Applied Science & Engineering and Medicine.

Traditions and student life

Founded in 1885, The University of Toronto Engineering Society is the oldest engineering society in Canada, comprising all undergraduate students in the faculty, and serving as its student government. The Society has been the trademark holder for the Skule nickname since 1984. Usage of the nickname began in the founding years of the School of Practical Science, when students used "skule" as a deliberate misspelling of "school".

The Skule mascot is known as the Ye Olde Mighty Skule Cannon, which began as a cannon stolen from in front of the Parliament Buildings in the fall of 1898, and has since been rebuilt in several incarnations. Students serving as "Cannon Guards" are led by a "Chief Attiliator" to protect the Cannon, which has been historically a target for attempted theft by other engineering schools. The Cannon is often fired (empty-shelled) during orientation events, and can also be heard during various events promoting Skule Spirit.

In September 2021, the University of Toronto Engineering Society, in partnership with the Faculty of Applied Science & Engineering, launched a Skule Mental Health Bursary, to provide access to mental health and wellness support for Engineering undergraduate students who are in need of financial aid.

Social events

The Skule Orchestra, founded in 2006, is a full symphonic orchestra of engineering students.  It organises Moment, the Valentine's Ball. Every year the Skule Choir, led by Malcolm McGrath, puts on a Christmas concert, usually located in Knox College Chapel with Malcolm McGrath on the main pipe organ and the Skule Brass Quintet.

The Lady Godiva Memorial Bnad (sic) and "White Noise Brigade" draws its name from the Godiva tradition. Like several other universities, Skule students frequently sing Godiva's Hymn (or the Engineer's Hymn) and revere Lady Godiva. The first week of classes in January following Christmas holidays is designated Godiva Week, and features numerous events, competitions and activities.

The Skule community hosts events, parties, activities, inter-faculty sports, a yearly musical production entitled Skule Nite and special interest lectures throughout the year.

Toike Oike
The phrase Toike Oike, variously pronounced toy-kee-oyk or toyk-oyk, is derived from an Irish janitor named Graham who was employed in the original School of Practical Science building. When students worked late in the labs and he had to close up the building, he would tell them to "take a hike", which sounded like "toike oike" due to his Irish accent. The phrase is used as the name of the engineering society's humour newspaper, the Toike Oike, in print since 1911. At some points in its publishing history, the humour could be extremely sexual and misogynistic, especially given the predominant male enrollment. One of the more popular editions was a parody of the popular movie Star Wars, rebranded Star Whores. Because of its huge popularity on campuses, copies had to be gotten the day of publication, and would be sold out the next day.

It is also the inspiration for the lyrics of the Skule Yell, the cheer of the engineering society and likely the oldest surviving Skule tradition:

Toike Oike! Toike Oike!
Ollum te Chollum te Chay!
Skule of Science, Skule of Science
Hurray! Hurray! Hurray!
We Are (we are!), We Are (we are!), We Are the Engineers!
We Can (we can!), We Can (we can!), Demolish Forty Beers!
Drink Rum (straight!) Rum (straight!) And Come Along With Us,
For We Don’t Give a Damn For Any Damn Man Who Don’t Give a Damn For Us!
Yaaaay Skule!

The Brute Force Committee: Needs identification of its role in Skule. It was an organization which was Skule’s cultural leadership.

Before the adoption of the Skule Yell, the original cheer was significantly shorter:

Who are we? Can’t you guess?
We are from the S.P.S.
S-C-H-O-O-L!!

Both Skule and the rest of the university recognized the original cheer as inadequate, so the first four lines of the new yell were proposed by A. G. Piper and adopted in 1897. The new yell was first performed that year at Theatre Night, a major campus-wide event for all faculties held on Halloween. The last four lines of the yell are essentially the chorus of Godiva's Hymn, and were first added on November 25, 1905, during the procession from Rosedale Field to the King Edward Hotel following a victory of the Toronto Varsity Blues rugby team over the Ottawa Rough Riders. During the game, Casey Baldwin, a Skuleman, had made a spectacular play in the last minutes to win the dominion championship for the university.

Notable alumni
H. E. T. Haultain (class of 1889) – Founder of The Ritual of the Calling of an Engineer
Frederick Walker Baldwin (class of 1906) – Designer of the Silver Dart, White Wing and Red Wing aircraft
Karl Brooks Heisey (class of 1922) - Mining engineer and mine president
Elsie MacGill (class of 1927) – First female aircraft designer, "Queen of the Hurricanes"
Jim Chamberlin (class of 1936) – Chief designer of the Avro Arrow, chief of engineering for NASA's Project Mercury
Gerald Bull (class of 1944, M.A.Sc. 1948, Ph.D. 1951) – Ballistics engineer and developer of long-range superguns
Lewis Urry (class of 1950) – Inventor of the alkaline battery and the lithium battery
Owen Maynard (class of 1951) - Senior Stress Engineer on the Avro Arrow, Chief of Lunar Excursion Module Engineering, then of Systems Engineering and of Mission Operations in NASA's Project Apollo Program Office
Alan Milliken Heisey Sr. (class of 1951) - Anti-nationalist, politician and publisher 
Peter Munk (class of 1952) – Founder and chairman of Barrick Gold
Paul Godfrey (class of 1962) – Politician and former president of the Toronto Blue Jays
Alfred Aho (class of 1963) – Co-creator of the AWK programming language, co-author of Compilers: Principles, Techniques, and Tools
Brian Kernighan (class of 1964) – Bell Labs scientist, co-author of The C Programming Language and The UNIX Programming Environment
Bernard Sherman (class of 1964) – Chairman and CEO of Apotex
Kim Vicente (class of 1985, prof. of industrial engineering 1992–) – Author, The Human Factor
Jeffrey Skoll (class of 1987) – First employee and president of eBay
Julie Payette (M.A.Sc. 1990) – Astronaut and Governor General of Canada
Isabel Bayrakdarian (class of 1997) – Opera singer
George Myhal  (class of 1978, Hon. LL.D. 2018) - Former senior managing partner of Brookfield Asset Management, philanthropist

References

Further reading
Robin Sutton Harris, Ian Montagnes. Cold Iron and Lady Godiva: Engineering Education at Toronto, 1920-1972. University of Toronto Press, 1973. .
Richard White. The Skule Story: The University of Toronto Faculty of Applied Science and Engineering. University of Toronto Press, 2000. .
Catherine Moriarty. John Galbraith, 1846-1914: Engineer and Educator. University of Toronto Press, 1989. .

External links
University of Toronto, Faculty of Applied Science & Engineering
Skule, the University of Toronto Engineering Society
Skule Traditions
Skulepedia, a repository of Skule history by alumni and students
Archival papers of Vernon Russell Davies, lecturer at the faculty who ran Vernon Davies Tutorial School, are held at the University of Toronto Archives and Records Management Services
Archival papers of Barry French, Professor (1961-?) and Associate Director of University of Toronto Institute for Aerospace Studies (1982-1985), held at the University of Toronto Archives and Records Management Services
Bahen Centre, University of Toronto

Applied Science and Engineering, Faculty of
Toronto